The Star is a 1952 American drama film directed by Stuart Heisler and starring Bette Davis. The plot tells the story of an aging, washed-up actress who is desperate to restart her career. Even though the film was a critical and commercial failure, Bette Davis received an Academy Award nomination for Best Actress.

Plot
Oscar-winning star Margaret "Maggie" Elliot (Bette Davis) is a poor actress struggling to accept her new, non-wealthy reality. She is in denial, and confident she somehow can re-launch her career to its earlier brilliance. After suffering another big disappointment while vainly striving to get one good role, she gets drunk, gets arrested for DUI, and spends a night in jail. She is bailed out by Jim Johannsen (Sterling Hayden), a younger former actor whom she had helped in the past. Jim, now comfortably settled as the owner of a boatyard, admits that he has loved her ever since those days, and helped by Margaret's daughter Gretchen (Natalie Wood), tries to help Margaret see that her days as a famous actress are already over. She reluctantly tries to work as a saleswoman in an upscale department store, but gossip from two customers wounds her pride and she runs out.  Her old agent manages to get her a screen test for a role in a film she'd always wanted to play. She takes a screen test for a supporting role, believing that if she plays that character as a sexy younger woman, rather than the middle-aged frump she is seen as by the studio, she might be able to win the more coveted lead role. It does not work.

At a Hollywood party thrown by her agent, she is offered a role in a new film about a fallen star who can't face the fact that it's all over. This new script is dedicated to washed-up actors and actresses who are obsessed by their former glory, by what they used to look like, what kind of an impression they’d make to stay on top, and how they behaved—demanding, bribing, power-hungry. It would be a story about those who can't look down and can't accept that their moment of glory is over and that the world has passed them by. Hearing the pitch delivered right to her face, and that she'd be the perfect actress to play the role, seems to have finally helped Margaret realize the cold truth about her future. She realizes that her film career is over, and she flees the party to the open arms of Jim and the love and acceptance of her daughter, from whom Margaret desperately tried to shield her failing career.

Cast

 Bette Davis as Margaret Elliot
 Sterling Hayden as Jim Johannsen
 Natalie Wood as Gretchen
 Warner Anderson as Harry Stone
 Minor Watson as Joe Morrison
 June Travis as Phyllis Stone
 Paul Frees as Richard Stanley
 Robert Warwick as R.J., aging actor at party
 Barbara Lawrence as herself
 Fay Baker as Margaret's sister
 Herb Vigran as Margaret's brother-in-law, Roy

Production

Katherine Albert and her husband Dale Eunson reportedly based the Margaret Elliott character on Joan Crawford, whose long friendship with the couple was ending as production began. Although it is sometimes said that she turned the role down, it never was offered to her. Bette Davis, who publicly disdained Crawford, thus eagerly took it.

Crawford retaliated after the Eunsons sent their daughter, starlet Joan Evans, Crawford's god-daughter, to the actress in the hope that Crawford would talk her out of marrying at age 17. Instead, Crawford arranged the wedding, held it in her house, and called the Eunsons afterward to tell them about it. "She set the whole thing up behind our backs", Albert complained. "She called the judge and the press. She didn't invite us to our own daughter's wedding."

See also

 1952 in film
 List of American films of 1952

References

External links
 
 
 
 

1952 films
1952 drama films
American drama films
American black-and-white films
1950s English-language films
Films scored by Victor Young
Films about actors
Films directed by Stuart Heisler
20th Century Fox films
1950s American films